Maria Thereza Fontella Goulart (born August 23, 1936) is the widow of the 24th president of Brazil, João Goulart, and served as First Lady during his presidency from 1961 until 1964, when he was deposed by a military-led coup d'état.

Biography

Early life
Born in the interior of the state of Rio Grande do Sul, daughter of Italian immigrants Dinarte Fontella and Maria Júlia Pasqualotto, who gave birth alone, on an isolated road, when she was 15 years old. With her mother she learned Italian and with her maternal uncle she learned to ride and shoot - already mastering target shooting at age 8.

At the age of 5 she moved in with Aunt Horaides Zambone, in São Borja, to recover from anemia. Still at the age of 5 she was enrolled in the Getúlio Vargas School Group, but was expelled. Then she was enrolled in an extremely strict nun school, where she stayed for two years, until she was expelled.

She studied at the American Methodist College, a boarding school in Porto Alegre, where he stayed under the care of a cousin, where in school, his life was under strict rules. She was a neighbor, in the city of São Borja, of Jango's house, whom she met personally at the age of fourteen. According to Maria Thereza, she was in charge of taking a correspondence to him at the request of Dinarte Dornelles (Getúlio Vargas' maternal uncle).

In Porto Alegre, at the house of aunt América Fontella, married to Spartacus Dornelles Vargas (Getúlio's brother), where at the age of 12 she met Leonel Brizola. She met Goulart when at 13 years old and he, 31. Maria Thereza held her debutante ball, and Goulart was among the guests. As she says, she didn't fall in love with her future husband at "first sight", because she didn't imagine that "she could date a person of her projection". Among Maria Thereza's cousins was the Yara Vargas politician, who later helped found the Democratic Labor Party (PDT).

Marriage and children

In 1955, when Maria Thereza finished her studies, she and Jango started dating. They got married in the following year when Maria Thereza was 16 and Jango was running for the Vice Presidency. At that time, there were separate elections for President and Vice President in Brazil and Jango would receive more votes than Juscelino Kubitschek, who was elected president. After her marriage, Maria Thereza became sister-in-law of Leonel Brizola, who was married to Jango's sister Neusa.

In 1960, Jango was re-elected Vice President, which allowed Maria Thereza to serve as Second Lady from 1956 to 1961, when Jânio Quadros resigned from the Presidency. When her husband assumed office, Maria Thereza became the youngest First Lady of the history of Brazil, at just 21 years of age.

Maria Thereza and Jango had two children: the former congressman João Vicente and the historian Deize. When she served as Second Lady, her family lived in the Chopin Building, next to the Copacabana Palace in Rio de Janeiro. During the time she served as First Lady, she lived in the Granja do Torto in the then recently built capital Brasília. She lived in Palácio da Alvorada, the official residence, for six months, but preferred the Granja do Torto because she liked horse racing.

Life as First Lady

In August 1961, Maria Thereza and her children were guests in a Spanish hotel owned by a friend of the Goulart family, while her husband was on a diplomatic mission in the People's Republic of China. One day, at breakfast, she was told that Jânio Quadros had resigned and that her husband would become the new president. Shortly after, journalists started incessantly calling her room.

Quadros advised her to stay at the hotel until the situation with the military ministers, who refused to recognize Jango as the new President because of his connections with members of the Brazilian Communist Party and the Brazilian Socialist Party, was solved. Maria Thereza only returned to Brazil when her husband assumed the Presidency.

As First Lady, Maria Thereza was responsible for the foundation of the headquarters of the Legião Brasileira de Assistência (Brazilian Legion of Aid) -- an organization founded in 1942 by then First Lady Darcy Vargas to help poor families—in Brasília. She hosted a large number of charitable events, being responsible for bringing members of the high society to participate in such events.

Maria Thereza chose to wear haute couture outfits to public events, and became a fashion icon, being compared to Jacqueline Kennedy and appearing on the covers of a large number of magazines. Her personal stylist was Dener Pamplona de Abreu. Prior to the coup, she was named one of the ten most beautiful women in the world by People magazine.

Life in exile
After the deposition of Jango on April 1, 1964 by the military, the Goulart family was forced to live in exile. Jango, Maria Thereza and their children lived in Uruguay. Later, Denise and João Vicente moved to London, while Jango and Maria Thereza went to Argentina, where Jango had business affairs. Jango died in the city of Mercedes on the night of December 6, 1976. The official version of his death is that he suffered a heart attack. This is uncertain as his body was not submitted for an autopsy and the attending physician wrote only the Spanish word enfermedad (sickness) as the causa mortis on his medical chart. He was buried in his native São Borja. Thirty thousand people attended his funeral, media coverage of which was censored by the military regime. Maria Thereza and her children were forbidden to return to Brazil until 1979's Amnesty law.

Amnesty
On November 15, 2008, Maria Thereza and Jango received political amnesty from the Federal Government. The former First Lady will receive an indemnification of R$ 644,000 (around US$ 322,000) to be paid in pensions of R$5,425 (around US$2,712) per month for Jango being restrained from practicing his job as a Lawyer. She will also receive an indemnification of R$100,000 (around US$50,000) for the 15 years in which her family was forbidden to return to Brazil.

Film
Director Susanna Lira will make the film Vestida de Silêncio, whose production was scheduled to begin in 2021, which will review the story of João Goulart through the eyes of Maria Thereza.

Further reading 
In 2019, the writer Wagner William released a biographical book about the former First Lady Maria Thereza Goulart.

References

|-

1936 births
People from São Borja
First ladies of Brazil
Second ladies of Brazil
Living people
Brazilian Labour Party (historical) politicians